Patriarch Alexander I may refer to:

 Pope Alexander I of Alexandria, ruled in 313–326 or 328
 Patriarch Alexander of Constantinople, ruled in 314–337